Hellersdorf is a locality in the borough of Marzahn-Hellersdorf in Berlin. Between 1986 and Berlin's 2001 administrative reform, it was a borough in its own right, consisting of the current area of Hellersdorf as well as Kaulsdorf and Mahlsdorf.

History
Before German reunification in 1989 it was part of East Berlin. Situated at the eastern part of Berlin, the area is mainly a large housing estate from the 1980s, made up of Plattenbau (concrete slab) buildings.

The historic village of Helwichstorpp was first mentioned in a 1375 land registry of Emperor Charles IV, then also Margrave of Brandenburg. The city of Berlin acquired the former Hellersdorf manor in 1886; it was finally incorporated by the 1920 Greater Berlin Act as a part of the Lichtenberg borough. During German reunification on October 3, 1990, a small part of Hönow (primarily around the last two stations of U5) was annexed by this borough.

Geography

Subdivision
Hellersdorf is divided into 3 zones (Ortslagen):
Hellersdorf-Nord
Hellersdorf-Ost
Hellersdorf-Süd

Transportation
Hellersdorf is served by the U5 line of the Berlin U-Bahn at the stations Kaulsdorf-Nord, Neue Grottkauer Straße, Cottbusser Platz, Hellersdorf, Louis-Lewin-Straße and Hönow.

References

External links

 Hellersdorf page on info-marzahn-hellersdorf.de

 Hellersdorf
Localities of Berlin
Former boroughs of Berlin
Populated places established in the 1370s